Edward Kellett may refer to:

Edward Kellett (Conservative politician) (1902–1943), British Member of Parliament and British Army officer
Edward Kellett (New Zealand politician) (1864–1922), New Zealand Member of Parliament for Dunedin North
Edward Kellett-Bowman (1931–2022), British business consultant, and politician